The 2011 APRA Silver Scroll Awards were held on Tuesday 13 September 2011 at the Auckland Town Hall, celebrating excellence in New Zealand songwriting. The Silver Scroll Award was presented to Dave Baxter of Avalanche City for the song "Love Love Love", and pop-rock band Hello Sailor were inducted into the New Zealand Music Hall of Fame.

Silver Scroll Award 

The Silver Scroll Award celebrates outstanding achievement in songwriting of original New Zealand pop music. The evening's music performances were produced by Karl Steven of Supergroove. Each of the nominated songs were covered in a new style by another artist.

Long list 

In July 2011 a top-20 long list was announced.

Ben King (Grand Rapids) "Singing Showers Golden Lights"
Annabel Alpers (Bachelorette) "Blanket"
Andrew Keoghan (Andrew Keoghan) "Bright Idea"
Annah MacDonald (Annah Mac) "'Celia"
Liam Finn (Liam Finn) Cold Feet
Kody Nielson (Kody and Bic) Darkness All Around Us
Stephen Heard, Dave Rowlands, Strachan Rivers and Tristan Colenso (Clap Clap Riot) "Everyone's Asleep"
Jolyon Mulholland (Mulholland) "Everything's Gonna Be Alright"
Ruban Nielson (Unknown Mortal Orchestra) "FFunny FFriends"
Gareth Thomas (Gareth Thomas) "Google Song"
Jesse Sheehan (Jesse Sheehan) "Grandma's Cookies"
Andrew Wilson, Michael Prain and Lachlan Anderson (Die Die Die) How Ye
Logan Bell and Jordan Bell (Katchafire) Lead Us
Lisa Crawley (Lisa Crawley) "Leaving" 
Delaney Davidson (Delaney Davidson) "Little Heart"
Anna Coddington and Ned Ngatae (Anna Coddington) "Little Islands"
Julia Deans (Julia Deans) "Little Survivor"
David Baxter (Avalanche City) "Love Love Love"
Jon Toogood and Karoline Tamati (The Adults) "Nothing to Lose"
Richard Setford (Bannerman) "She Was A Mountainside"

New Zealand Music Hall of Fame 

Pop-rock band Hello Sailor were inducted into the New Zealand Music Hall of Fame. The inducted band members were Graham Brazier, Dave McArtney, Harry Lyon, Rick Ball, Stuart Pearce and Paul Woolright. Steve Abel and Gin Wigmore performed Hello Sailor's song "Blue Lady".

Other awards 

Four other awards were presented at the Silver Scroll Awards: APRA Maioha Award (for excellence in contemporary Maori music),  SOUNZ Contemporary Award (for creativity and inspiration in composition) and two awards acknowledging songs with the most radio and television play in New Zealand and overseas.

APRA song awards 

Outside of the Silver Scroll Awards, APRA presented four genre awards in 2011. The APRA Best Pacific Song was presented at the Pacific Music Awards, the APRA Best Country Music Song was presented at the New Zealand Country Music Awards and the APRA Children’s Song of the Year and What Now Video of the Year were presented at StarFest.

References 

New Zealand music awards
2011 in New Zealand music